The Fal-Car, originally known as A Car Without A Name, was an American automobile manufactured from 1909 until 1914 by a company that identified itself in advertisements only as Department C, 19 North May Street, Chicago. The address had previously been the location where the Reliable-Dayton automobile had been built. It was advertised as "trim, classy, speedy and efficient".

The idea behind the name, or lack thereof, was that it would allow its buyers of the generic vehicle to name the vehicle as they wished (or as ego permitted) without the expense or bother of setting up their own automobile concern. Such practices in the early days of the automobile market were not uncommon, however most companies that were involved with such endeavors at least had publicly known names.

The A Car Without A Name was equipped with a 30 hp engine, three-speed transmission, came in three body styles (roadster, coupe-tonneau and touring car) and priced below $1,700 per unit. Because the car had no name, it is impossible to find a concrete production number for the period that builds were undertaken.

By 1910 the Car was given an official name, the F.A.L. or Fal-Car, which was derived by its backers' last names of Fauntleroy, Averill and Lowe. Under the management of Norton H. Van Sicklen, the Fal-Car continued in production through 1914 at its factory in Chicago until its assets were liquidated at auction. The former business location became an empty lot.

References

 
  p. 14.
 One-Hundred Makes that Didn't. Editors of Collectible Automobile. Collectible Automobile Magazine. p. 58.  Volume 17, Number 4.  December, 2000.

Defunct motor vehicle manufacturers of the United States
Motor vehicle manufacturers based in Illinois